The initialism ROT may refer to:

 Recording of transmission, in broadcasting
 The Refugee Olympic Team at the 2016 Summer Olympics
 Retroactive overtime
 ROT (aviation) (rate one turn), a standard turning rate for aircraft
 ROT13, rotation-based cipher in cryptography
 Rotorua Airport, New Zealand, IATA code
 TAROM, a Romanian airline, ICAO code

See also
 Rot (disambiguation)